Zahrah Merrikhi (born 1959), is an Iranian People's Mujahedin politician. In September 2017, she was elected as the new MEK Secretary General, replacing Zohreh Akhyani (who had served from 2011). In 2021 the MEK held internal elections where Merrikhi was voted as secretary general for another term.

Early life and career 
She was born in 1959 and joined People's Mujahedin of Iran in years leading to the 1979 Iranian Revolution. During this time, she was summoned and interrogated by the Shah's intelligence service. Merrikhi's younger brother, Ali, was killed in 1988 by the current Iranian government. One of the senior party figures from 2003 onwards, she was the coordinator of the office representing Maryam Rajavi. Merrikhi replaced Zohreh Akhyani as the secretary-general in 2017. Merrikhi currently receives the support of 18 co-Secretaries General (including seven former Secretaries General) and three deputies from the organization’s younger generation.

Election as Secretary General

In 2017, Merrikhi was elected as Secretary General for the People's Mujahedin.

The election process 
Party regulations stipulate that secretaries general are elected for a two-year term The election process comprises three stages:
 The first assembly is held by members of the People's Mujahedin Central Council. During this stage an initial 12 candidates were introduced, where Merrikhi received the majority vote.
 At the second assembly, senior party officials and cadres cast their votes on the four final candidates, with Merrikhi led the vote tally again.
 At the third (final) assembly, Merrikhi was unanimously elected.

References 

1959 births
People's Mojahedin Organization of Iran politicians
Living people
21st-century Iranian women politicians
21st-century Iranian politicians
People from Qaem Shahr